William Conklin (December 25, 1872 – March 21, 1935) was an American actor. He appeared in more than 80 silent films between 1913 and 1929. He was born in Brooklyn, New York, and died in Hollywood, California.

Partial filmography 

 Arizona (1913)
 Neal of the Navy (1915), a serial
 The Sultana (1916)
 The Yellow Pawn (1916)
 Joan the Woman (1916)
 Spellbound (1916) as Harrington Graeme
 The Devil's Bait (1917)
 Out of the Wreck (1917)
 The Prison Without Walls (1917)
 The Serpent's Tooth (1917)
 The Law of the Land (1917)
 Golden Rule Kate (1917)
 The Price Mark (1917)
 Sold at Auction (1917)
 Love Letters (1917)
 Flare-Up Sal (1918)
 Love Me (1918)
 Tyrant Fear (1918)
 The Mating of Marcella (1918)
 The Turn of a Card (1918)
 Come Again Smith (1919)
 The Haunted Bedroom (1919)
 Hay Foot, Straw Foot (1919)
 The Virtuous Thief (1919)
 Stepping Out (1919)
 What Every Woman Learns (1919)
 Red Hot Dollars (1919)
 When Fate Decides (1919)
 The Drifters (1919)
 The Woman in the Suitcase (1920)
 Sex (1920)
 Love Madness (1920)
 When Dawn Came (1920)
The Brute Master (1920)
 Hairpins (1920)
 Beau Revel (1921)
 Blind Hearts (1921)
 The Lure of Youth (1921)
The Other Woman (1921)
 Iron to Gold (1922)
 Up and Going (1922)
 When Husbands Deceive (1922)
 The Woman He Married (1922)
 Three Who Paid (1923)
 The Lonely Road (1923)
 The Lone Star Ranger (1923)
 The Goldfish (1924)
 Never Say Die (1924)
 Ports of Call (1925)
 The Rag Man (1925)
 Head Winds (1925)
 Fifth Avenue Models (1925)
 A Gentleman Roughneck (1925)
 Counsel for the Defense (1925)
 Old Ironsides (1926)
 Sweet Rosie O'Grady (1926)
 Outlaws of Red River (1927)
 Tumbling River (1927)
 Rose of the Golden West (1927)
 That's My Daddy (1928)
 Life's Crossroads (1928)
 The Divine Lady (1929)
 Shanghai Rose (1929)

References

External links

 
 

1872 births
1935 deaths
American male film actors
American male silent film actors
Male actors from New York (state)
20th-century American male actors